Aks (Urdu: عکس) is a first Pakistani 3D horror film directed and produced by Asif Pervez. The film features Meera, Roman Khan, Faiza Asif, Arslan Sheraz, Jyoti Dagar, Shyraa Roy, Nidhi Kumar and Fahad Rajpoot.

Plot
Two newly married couples go for a getaway to visit an abandoned village. Consequences start happening when they realize that the place is haunted.

Cast
 Roman Khan as Rayan
 Arslan Sheraz as Daniyal
Sarfaraz Ali Khan
 Faiza Asif as Aleesha
 Jyoti Dagar as Sophie
 Shyraa Roy as Sania
 Fahad Rajpoot as Professor Shareef
 Araj Hassan as Mr.X
 Farwa Shah as Sara Khan
 Nidhi Kumar as Zoya 
 Meera as Meera (Guest appearance)

Release
An earlier announcement reported that the film was stated for release in December 2017. After completing the filming, it was confirmed that it is scheduled for release in February 2018.

Music

The music for Aks is composed by Asim Saadi while the lyrics are written by Asif. The songs are produced by Asim Saadi Studios. The full music album is expected to be released in January 2018.

References

External links
 
 https://www.facebook.com/AksTheMovie/

2018 films
2018 horror films
Lollywood films
Pakistani horror films
2018 3D films
Pakistani 3D films